Spork Press is a small press in Tucson, Arizona edited and constructed by Richard Siken, Drew Burk, Andrew Shuta, Joel Smith, and Jake Levine. Beginning in 2001, it began publishing a quarterly literary magazine called Spork, which is often bound hardback.

History
Spork is, as of 2022, a wholly other beast. Shuta and Joel and Jake have gone, and Siken had a stroke, and so it's just Drew sitting in their new(ish) spot off Broadway in Tucson, figuring out what the heck to do. 

What they're (he is?) doing is publishing Matt Roar's book of skate poetry My War, and the collaborative book by Felicity Fenton and Drew Burk Elegy for My Art Monster, and seeing what's what. What's what now. Does it matter whether or not you're doing things correctly? That's the main issue at play with Spork in 2022. Ought they do things correctly? Drew thinks no. 

At one time Spork Press was a publisher specializing in hand-made literary magazines with the occasional book release. It now produces a larger output of books and tapes while occasionally publishing the Spork literary magazine.

Spork Press also produces chapbooks and novels. The books published include Roderick Maclean's Tropic/of/Cubicle. Beth Toener's A La Recherche Du Petit Pseudo-Rockstars Perdu (Split E.P.) has been released in serial form.

In 2010 Siken and Burk decided to take a break from the regular publication of a literary magazine, choosing to instead publish issues of the journal only when they had an idea they were excited about. Issue 9.1 "The Middles Of Things", was the first along these new lines. Five authors were tasked with writing the middle of a novel, but were not allowed to write the beginning or the end; they were instructed to treat it as though they had walked into the middle of a movie, and to simply describe what they saw. Sharon McGill provided the illustrations for each piece, and Amelia Gray ordered the pieces, writing interstitial parts and creating a loose impression of a continuous narrative through the book. She chose to order the pieces from most conventional to the least. In the absence of the regular magazine, Spork has been publishing a chapbook series, though the term "chapbook" is applied loosely: "This here, this mixtape? It's a chapbook. This novel? It's a chapbook. Everything we do is a chapbook." Burk said, and that is how things are done by the publisher. Chapbooks have traditionally been throwaway items – Spork subverts this idea with letterpressed hardback hand-bound books, and an inattention to the rest of the things chapbooks usually are.

Most recently, Ariana Reines' THURSDAY (Spork Press, 2012), Joyelle McSweeney's the Necropastoral (Spork Press, 2011), Lara Glenum's All Hopped Up on Fleshy Dum Dums (Spork Press, 2014) and Zach Schomburg's, From the Fjords (Spork Press, 2011) have received attention for their quirky design and the texts themselves.

The Spork team consists of Drew Burk (Production/Editor), Andrew Shuta (Design/Production), Richard Siken (Editor), Joel Smith (Editor), Jake Levine (Editor), and others who help out.

Writers

 Shanna Compton
 Stephen Elliott
 Matthea Harvey
 Tao Lin
 Ander Monson
 Stacey Richter
 Peter Rock
 Davy Rothbart
 Joshua Marie Wilkinson
 Amelia Gray

Mixtapes and cassette releases 
The Spork Mixtape series is, contrary to the current habit of referring to playlists and sometimes mixes on CD as 'mixtapes', a mix of music on a cassette. Highest-quality audio is sourced, sequenced and mixed, mastered at 32 bits and then recorded from the mastered source one at a time on a Sony dual-deck.
 February 2013, Mixtape 1
 February 2014, Mixtape 2
 "King Cobra" by Young Family. Spork's first official release toward transitioning from a book press to a press and music label.
 "NOTHING" by Isaiah Toothtaker. Spork's second official release, increasing the pace toward becoming both a press and a music label.

Chapbook Authors 

 Nat Baldwin
 Daniel Mahoney
 Sophia Le Fraga
 Isaiah Toothtaker
 Young Family
 Kazim Ali
 Lara Glenum
 Simon Jacobs
 Rauan Klassnik
 Brian Blanchfield
 Ben Fama
 Matthew Dickman
 Ariana Reines
 John Beer
 Joyelle McSweeney
 Zachary Schomburg
 Feng Sun Chen
 Colin Winnette
 Dan Beachy-Quick
 Gordan Massman
 Heather Palmer
 Drew Krewer
 Jake Levine

External links
 Spork Press

References

Publishing companies of the United States
Small press publishing companies
Publishing companies established in 2001